Trịnh Kiểm (1503–1570) ruled northern part of Vietnam from 1545 to 1570. Trịnh Kiểm was the founder of the Trịnh lords or House of Trịnh who ruled Dai Viet while a succession of figurehead Later Lê emperors took the role as puppet government. During his rule, the war with the Mạc dynasty continued. Although he was the de facto ruler of Dai Viet during his reign, he never claimed himself the title of Lord, hence he is not the first official Trịnh lord but his son Trịnh Tùng is the first. Later Trịnh Kiểm was posthumously proclaimed a Trịnh lord by his descendants.

Background 

Trịnh Kiểm claimed descent from Trịnh Khả, who was one of the top aides of Lê Lợi and later became the top official during the reign of child-king Lê Nhân Tông. His relationship to the General Trịnh who defeated a rebel army in 1511 and then led a rebellion of his own in 1517 is unknown. Also unknown is his relationship to Trịnh Duy Dai and Trịnh Duy Sản (two of the leaders of the first revolt against Mạc Đăng Dung).

Nguyễn/Trinh alliance
A second revolt against Mạc Đăng Dung took place not long after Dung usurped the throne and proclaimed himself Emperor of Vietnam in 1527. This second revolt was led by Nguyễn Kim whose second-in-command was his son-in-law, Trịnh Khiêm (who married Kim's daughter Ngoc Bao). The second revolt allowed the Nguyễn-Trịnh army to capture the Western Capital (Tay Do) and enthrone Emperor Lê Trang Tông, in 1533.

The Nguyễn-Trịnh alliance sent a formal embassy to China that denounced the usurpation of Mạc Đăng Dung and asked for help. In 1536, the Chinese delegation concluded that Dung had usurped the throne of the Lê Emperors. After hearing the report, the Jiajing Emperor dispatched an army that arrived on the border of Vietnam in 1537. However, with protestations of loyalty to the Ming dynasty and the offer of a piece of north Vietnam to the Chinese, Mạc Đăng Dung convinced the Chinese to leave. The official position of the Chinese government was that the Mạc dynasty should rule in the north and the Lê government should rule in the south. The Nguyễn-Trịnh alliance refused to accept this settlement, continuing the war.

Army commander
In 1541, Mạc died and his grandson, Phước Hải, took over. In 1545, Nguyễn Kim was assassinated by a Mạc supporter. Nguyễn had two young sons (Nguyễn Hoàng and Nguyễn Uông) but Trịnh Kiểm took control of the Royal army.

The Nguyễn-Trịnh alliance, now under the command of Trịnh Kiểm, continued to fight the Mạc. A new king was enthroned as Lê Trung Tông in 1548, then another Lê king, Lê Anh Tông, was enthroned in 1556. In 1558 the eldest son of Nguyễn Kim, Nguyễn Hoàng, was sent to the south to take control over the recently conquered province of Quảng Nam. By 1665, the Royal (Trịnh) army had captured all provinces south of the Red River and were threatening Hanoi.

Succession
In 1569, in failing health, Trịnh Kiểm passed power to his eldest son, Trịnh Coi. In 1570, Trịnh Kiểm died. In the same year, Trịnh Coi was defeated by a Mạc army and was replaced by his younger, more capable brother, Trịnh Tùng.

See also
 Lê dynasty
 List of Vietnamese dynasties

Sources 

Annam and its Minor Currency Chapter 16 (downloaded May 2006)
A Glimpse of Vietnams History (downloaded May 2006)

|-

Trịnh lords
1503 births
1570 deaths
16th-century Vietnamese monarchs
People from Thanh Hóa province
Founding monarchs